Frail Women is a 1932 British drama film directed by Maurice Elvey and starring Mary Newcomb, Owen Nares, Frank Pettingell and Herbert Lomas. In the years after World War I a Colonel marries his war-time mistress.

It was made at Twickenham Studios with sets designed by James A. Carter.

Cast
 Mary Newcomb as The Woman (Lilian Hamilton) 
 Owen Nares as The Man (Colonel Leonard Harvey) 
 Margaret Vines as The Girl (Mary Willis) 
Frederick Peisley as The Boy (Peter Farrer) 
Jane Welsh as The Sister (Eleanor Farrer) 
Herbert Lomas as The Solicitor (Burrows) 
Edmund Gwenn as The Bookmaker (Jim Willis) 
Athole Stewart as The Father (Sir Robert Farrer) 
Frank Pettingell as The Employer (McWhirter) 
Miles Malleson as The Registrar 
Heather Angel as The Girl (uncredited)

References

Bibliography
 Low, Rachael. Filmmaking in 1930s Britain. George Allen & Unwin, 1985.
 Wood, Linda. British Films, 1927-1939. British Film Institute, 1986.

External links

1932 films
1932 drama films
Films directed by Maurice Elvey
1930s English-language films
British drama films
Films shot at Twickenham Film Studios
British World War I films
Films set in London
British black-and-white films
1930s British films